Same-sex marriage in Argentina has been legal since July 22, 2010. A bill to legalize same-sex marriage was passed by the Chamber of Deputies on May 5, 2010, and by the Senate on July 15. President Cristina Fernández de Kirchner gave her assent on July 21, and the law went into effect the following day.

Argentina was the first country in Latin America, the second in the Americas and the Hispanic world, and the second in the Southern Hemisphere to legalize same-sex marriage. It was the tenth country worldwide to do so. Civil unions have also been available nationwide since 2015, providing some of the rights of marriage.

Civil unions
In the first decade of the 21st century, civil unions ( or unión convivencial) were legalized in four jurisdictions in Argentina: the Autonomous City of Buenos Aires (2002), the province of Río Negro (2003), the city of Villa Carlos Paz (2007), and the city of Río Cuarto (2009). Civil unions provide some of the rights granted to married couples and can only be entered into by couples who have lived together for a given time, usually one or two years.

Civil unions were legalized nationwide on 1 August 2015 when the Civil and Commercial Code (Código Civil y Commercial), which replaced the former Civil Code, came into effect. The Code was approved by Parliament in October 2014 and promulgated by President Fernández de Kirchner on October 7, 2014. Couples in civil unions have access to hospital visitation rights, inheritance and pension rights, among other rights and benefits.

Unregistered cohabitation
On August 19, 2008, the Government of Argentina announced that it was allowing cohabiting same-sex couples who have lived together for over five years the right to collect the pensions of their deceased partners. This was the first time that unregistered cohabitation or rights for same-sex partners were recognized nationwide. Consequently, four Argentine labor unions extended National Security System medical benefits to employees' same-sex partners (the system operates jointly with unions in the health care area); the benefits are available to members of teacher, commerce employee, executive, and air-transport personnel unions. In December 2005, a judge ordered prisons across the province of Córdoba to authorize conjugal visits for all gay prisoners and allow sexual relations between inmates who develop relationships in prison.

Same-sex marriage

Two weeks before the 2009 mid-term elections, Justice Minister Aníbal Fernández issued a statement saying that he was in favor of starting a same-sex marriage debate in Congress, that a gender-neutral law would "end discrimination", and that "many people are demanding it." Fernández also said that former President Néstor Kirchner, husband of President Cristina Fernández de Kirchner, supported having a wider discussion on same-sex marriage in the country. President Fernández de Kirchner's position on same-sex marriage was unknown at the time. Justice Minister Fernández said he was presently "working toward" presenting a draft law to Congress, and that his ministry must first "evaluate all the different aspects of the issue." The bill was never presented. At this time, LGBT groups gradually won over members of the Chamber of Deputies to their cause, aided by the decentralized nature of congressional parties which allowed advocacy groups to post incremental gains.

In late 2009, the Argentine Congress considered two proposals, sponsored by Silvia Augsburger (Socialist Party) and Vilma Ibarra (New Encounter), to amend the Civil Code to permit same-sex marriages. Ibarra and Augsburger later agreed to unify their separate initiatives into one draft law. On October 27, 2009, the same-sex marriage bill was debated in the Chamber of Deputies' General Law Committee and the Committee on Family, Women, Children and Youth. Ibarra expressed her desire to have same-sex marriage in Argentina approved by the end of 2009. Debate on the bill continued on November 5 and on November 10, before being postponed and resuming in March 2010. A survey taken at the time found that 70% of Argentines supported legalizing same-sex marriage.

On April 15, 2010, the Chamber of Deputies' General Law Committee and the Committee on Family, Women, Children and Youth recommended the legalization of same-sex marriage. On May 5, 2010, the Chamber of Deputies passed the same-sex marriage bill by a vote of 126 to 110. On July 6, the Senate's General Law Committee recommended rejection of the bill. The bill was originally scheduled to be voted on July 14. After a marathon session that went into the early hours of the next day, on July 15 the Senate passed the same-sex marriage bill by a vote of 33 to 27. On July 21, President Cristina Fernández de Kirchner signed the bill into law. The law was published in the official gazette on July 22 and took effect that same day. The law grants same-sex couples all the rights and responsibilities of marriage, including the right to adopt children. The first marriages were performed on July 30, 2010.

On July 27, 2012, a Buenos Aires couple, Alejandro Grinblat and Carlos Dermgerd, became the first men in Latin America to obtain double paternity of a newborn. Their baby, Tobías, is the natural son of one of the two men and was born to a surrogate mother. He became the first person in Argentina with a birth certificate listing two fathers.

Judicial rulings

On February 14, 2007, activists María Rachid and Claudia Castrosín Verdú filed a judicial appeal to declare articles 172 and 188 of the Civil Code unconstitutional for preventing same-sex couples from marrying.

On November 12, 2009, a court in Buenos Aires approved the marriage of a same-sex couple, Alex Freyre and José María Bello, ruling that articles 172 and 188 of the Civil Code were unconstitutional. The city Chief of Government, Mauricio Macri, said he would not appeal the ruling, but the marriage was blocked on November 30 by another court, pending review by the Supreme Court. In December 2009, the Governor of Tierra del Fuego Province, Fabiana Ríos, ordered the civil registry office to perform and register their marriage. On December 28, the two men were legally wed in Ushuaia, the provincial capital city, making them the first same-sex couple to marry in Latin America. On April 14, 2010, the marriage was declared null and void, but it technically remained legal because the decision was not communicated to the parties. The married couple said that they would appeal the court's decision if notified. The couple announced their divorce in 2015. Journalist Bruno Bimbi revealed that, although the men were both gay, they were not a couple and only acted as such as part of a plan to champion LGBT rights.

On March 10, 2010, a judge in Buenos Aires declared a second same-sex marriage, between Damián Bernath and Jorge Esteban Salazar Capón, illegal. On April 16, a third same-sex marriage between two women was annulled by a judge who ruled that Argentine law limited marriage to a man and a woman. Administrative Judge Elena Liberatori later overturned that decision and declared the marriage valid, ordering the Civil Registry of Buenos Aires to deliver the marriage certificate to the court.
  
Following the first legal same-sex marriage in December 2009, seven other same-sex couples were joined in legal matrimony in Argentina before the national law legalizing same-sex marriage took effect at the end of July 2010. At that time, the Supreme Court was considering several cases concerning the right of same-sex couples to marry. On July 2, 2010, some media reported that the Supreme Court had a prepared ruling in favor of Rachid and Castrosín's case filed in February 2007, but eventually decided not to release their ruling following the legalisation of same-sex marriage.

Opposition to the legislation
In July 2010, while the law was under consideration, Cardinal Jorge Bergoglio, the Archbishop of Buenos Aires (later Pope Francis), wrote a letter to Argentina's cloistered nuns in which he said:

After L'Osservatore Romano reported this, several priests expressed their support for the law and one was defrocked. Observers believe that the church's strident opposition and Bergoglio's language, which one political opponent characterized as "medieval, reactionary", worked in favor of the law's passage and that Roman Catholic officials learned from their failed campaign against the same-sex marriage law to adopt a different tone in later debates on social issues such as parental surrogacy. As of 2005, more than three-fourths of Argentines identified themselves as Roman Catholics, but less than two-fifths of them attended religious service at least once a month.

Evangelical groups also joined the opposition.

Statistics

By July 2012, about 5,800 same-sex marriages had occurred in Argentina, distributed by jurisdiction as follows: Buenos Aires (1,455), the Autonomous City of Buenos Aires (1,405), Santa Fe (664), Córdoba (632), Mendoza (389), Tucumán (199), Salta (178), Entre Ríos (128), Neuquén (101), San Juan (70), Misiones (64), Río Negro (64), La Pampa (58), Jujuy (56), Chaco (51), Catamarca (49), Chubut (47), Formosa (44), Santiago del Estero (42), San Luis (37), Santa Cruz (35), Corrientes (31), La Rioja (31), and Tierra del Fuego (14). By July 2014, 9,362 same-sex marriages had been performed in Argentina.

Seven years after the same-sex marriage legislation was approved, more than 16,200 same-sex marriages had taken place in Argentina. 4,286 and 3,836 same-sex marriages were performed in the Autonomous City of Buenos Aires and the province of Buenos Aires, respectively. As Argentine law does not require couples who wish to wed to be Argentine nationals or residents of Argentina, many couples from abroad have come to Argentina to marry, including many couples from Chile and Paraguay. This has made Argentina, and especially Buenos Aires, a very popular marriage destination for same-sex couples.

By July 2018, 18,000 same-sex couples had married in Argentina.

The following table shows the number of civil unions and marriages performed in the city of Buenos Aires, according to data collected by the city. Figures for 2020 are lower than previous years because of the restrictions in place due to the COVID-19 pandemic.

Religious performance
A lesbian couple, Victoria Escobar and Romina Charur, were married at a Reform Jewish synagogue in Buenos Aires in April 2016, the first Jewish same-sex wedding in Latin America.

In July 2016, couple Jesús Regules and Jonathan Díaz were married at the Nuestra Señora del Valle church in the town of San Roque near Maipú by an Anglican priest, the first church wedding for a same-sex couple in Argentina.

Public opinion
According to a Pew Research Center survey conducted between November 15, 2013 and January 8, 2014, 52% of Argentines supported same-sex marriage, while 40% were opposed.

A 2015 Ipsos poll found that 59% of Argentines were in favour of same-sex marriage. A further 16% supported civil unions or other forms of legal recognition.

A September–October 2016 survey by the Varkey Foundation found that 73% of 18–21-year-olds supported same-sex marriage in Argentina. 

The 2017 AmericasBarometer showed that 65% of Argentines supported same-sex marriage. This level of support was the second highest among the 11 South American countries polled, behind neighboring Uruguay at 75%.

A May 2021 Ipsos poll showed that 73% of Argentines supported same-sex marriage, 9% supported civil unions but not marriage, while 10% were opposed to all legal recognition for same-sex couples, and 8% were undecided. In addition, 20% of Argentines had already attended the wedding of a same-sex couple.

See also

LGBT rights in Argentina
Recognition of same-sex unions in the Americas

Notes

References

LGBT rights in Argentina
Argentina
Presidency of Cristina Fernández de Kirchner
2010 in LGBT history
Law of Argentina